860–880 Lake Shore Drive is a twin pair of glass-and-steel apartment towers on N. Lake Shore Drive along Lake Michigan in the Streeterville neighborhood of Chicago, Illinois. Construction began in 1949 and the project was completed in 1951. The towers were added to the National Register of Historic Places on August 28, 1980, and were designated as Chicago Landmarks on June 10, 1996. The 26-floor, 254-ft (82 m) tall towers were designed by the architect Ludwig Mies van der Rohe, and dubbed the "Glass House" apartments. Construction was by the Chicago real estate developer Herbert Greenwald, and the Sumner S. Sollitt Company. The design principles were copied extensively and are now considered characteristic of the modern International Style as well as essential for the development of modern High-tech architecture.

The towers were not entirely admired at the time they were built, yet they went on to be the prototype for steel and glass skyscrapers worldwide. Initially, it was difficult to acquire financing for the project, turned down by lenders like Baird & Warner, who considered the design scheme to be too extreme. 860–880 Lake Shore Drive Apartments embody a Modernistic tone with their verticality, grids of steel and glass curtain walls (a hallmark of Mies' skyscrapers), and complete lack of ornamentation. Tenants had to accept the neutral gray curtains that were uniform throughout the buildings; no other curtains or blinds were permitted lest they mar the external appearance. Since Mies was a master of minimalist composition, his principle was "less is more" as it is demonstrated in his self-proclaimed "skin and bones" architecture.

The structural engineer for the project was Georgia Louise Harris Brown, who was the first African American to receive an architecture degree from the University of Kansas, and the second African American woman to receive an architecture license in the United States.

Controversy

This building, like many of his Chicago high-rise structures, caused controversy in the pure minimalist community due to its mullions. Mies is hailed as the father of "less is more"; however, 860–880 Lake Shore Drive is covered in non-functional I-beam mullions. Mies explains how the mullions do not violate his less is more philosophy in a 1960 interview: "To me structure is something like logic. It is the best way to do things and express them". The mullions on his buildings reflect the inner structure and therefore give truth to the aesthetic of the building. The idea of truth in architecture aligns with the aesthetic and principles of the international style as taught at the Bauhaus.

Although the 860-880 buildings were the first high-rises to look like they were sheathed with a curtain wall, they in fact were not, because the windows were attached to the structure, not to the decorative-only mullions. It was van der Rohe's 900-910 North Lake Shore (aka Esplanade Apartments) just to the north that were the first high-rises to actually have an uninterrupted glass/aluminum curtain wall, although not the first with a curtain wall.

Renovations
Krueck and Sexton Architects of Chicago were commissioned to renovate the historical towers. Teaming up with them were the preservation architects, Harboe Architects and the forensic and structural analysis firm, Wiss, Janney, Elstner Associates, Inc. They were directed to fix prior renovations which took away from the historical accuracy of the towers. Architects were assigned to restore the distorted lighting scheme with original translucent glass, replace the deteriorating travertine plaza, which connects the two towers, and exchange for stones with more historical precision.

Recognition

 The buildings were finished in 1951 and were featured in a 1957 article in Life Magazine on Mies.
 In 1996 they became the first buildings designed by Mies van der Rohe to receive Chicago Landmark Status.
 The glass towers have been on the National Register of Historic Places since 1980.
 In June 2005, the United States Postal Service included the towers in the commemorative stamp program, Masterworks of Modern Architecture, wherein they were listed as one of the "12 outstanding examples of modern buildings".
 In celebration of the 2018 Illinois Bicentennial, 860-880 Lake Shore Drive was selected as one of the Illinois 200 Great Places  by the American Institute of Architects Illinois component (AIA Illinois).

Figures and statistics
 The twin towers are 26 stories high.
 The buildings are 46 feet apart.
 The steel skeletal frames rest on a 21-foot grid and are uniform in their design.
 The building was originally designed for 860 to contain 90 three bedroom apartments and 880 to hold 158 one bedroom apartments. Many of the units have been combined to enlarge living spaces.

Zoned schools
Residents are zoned to Chicago Public Schools. Residents are zoned to Ogden School and Wells Community Academy High School.

References

External links

 Chicago Landmarks
  Emporis
 Article and photos by a+t architecture publishers
 IIT Mies Society page on 860–880 Lake Shore Drive
 860–880 Lake Shore Drive website (Official site of 860-880 Owner/Tenants and Trust)
 The Glass House, 860-880 Lake Shore Drive,  A Home for Gracious Living (1957 brochure)
 Chicago's "Glass Houses:" Restoring the Recent Past at 860-880 Lake Shore Drive (2009 article)
Illinois Great Places - 860-880 Lake Shore Drive
Society of Architectural Historians SAH ARCHIPEDIA entry on 860-880 Lake Shore Drive

Lake Shore Drive Apartments
Apartment buildings in Chicago
Housing cooperatives in the United States
Residential buildings completed in 1951
Residential buildings on the National Register of Historic Places in Chicago
Residential skyscrapers in Chicago
Twin towers
1940s architecture in the United States
International style architecture in Illinois
Modernist architecture in Illinois
1951 establishments in Illinois